The Nikon D5200 is an F-mount DSLR camera with a newly developed  24.1-megapixel DX-format CMOS image sensor  first announced by Nikon on November 6, 2012 for most of the world and January 7, 2013 for the North American market.

The Toshiba TOS-5105 (HEZ1) APS-C CMOS Image Sensor features 14-bit resolution NEF (RAW) and ISO 6400, expandable to 25,600. The D5200 integrates the same Multi-CAM 4800DX autofocus system as the D7000. The camera replaces the D5100 and is replaced by the Nikon D5300.

Initially, the camera was available worldwide except in North America. While Nikon officially announced the D5200 in Europe, Asia, and Australia in November 2012, Nikon's U.S. operating company did not initially announce the camera, and did not update its website to include this model. The official North American launch came during the CES show in Las Vegas, on January 13, 2013.

Feature list 
 Nikon EXPEED 3 image/video processor.
 Toshiba TOS-5105 24.1 MP Image Sensor
 Automatic correction of lateral chromatic aberration for JPEGs. Correction-data is additionally stored in RAW-files and used by Nikon Capture NX, View NX and some other RAW tools.
 HD video mode with autofocus. Up to 1080p at 24, 25 and 50i, 30 and 60i, 720p at 50 or 60 frames per second (fps). H.264/MPEG-4 AVC Expeed video processor. HDMI out with support of uncompressed video (clean HDMI)
 Active D-Lighting (4 level and auto).
  articulated 921,000-dot LCD.
 Live View shooting mode with Contrast Detect and face priority auto focus (activated with a dedicated button).
 Continuous Drive up to 5 frames per second. Interval timer supported.
 Bracketing (exposure, Active D-Lighting and white-balance).
 Auto scene recognition mode with 16 pre-programmed scenes.
 In camera HDR mode.
 Inbuilt time-lapse photography intervalometer
 Quiet shooting mode.
 Built-in sensor cleaning system (vibrating low-pass filter) and airflow control system.
 HDMI HD video output.
 Stereo microphone input (has stereo built-in mic)
 Enhanced built-in RAW processing with extended Retouch menu for image processing without using a computer: D-Lighting, Red-eye reduction, Trimming, Monochrome & filter effects, Color balance, Image overlay, NEF (RAW) processing, Quick retouch, Straighten, Distortion control, Fisheye, Color outline, Color sketch, Perspective control, Miniature effect, Selective Color, Edit movie, Side-by-side comparison.
 File formats: JPEG, NEF (Nikon's RAW, 14-bit compressed), H.264 video codec.
 Compatible with WLAN Adaptor WU-1a to transmit images from the camera to Apple IOS or Android smart phone or tablet computer with remote shooting control.
 EN-EL14 Lithium-ion Battery.
 GPS interface for direct geotagging supported by Nikon GP-1

Like Nikon's other consumer level DSLRs, the D5200 has no in-body autofocus motor, and fully automatic autofocus requires one of the current 162 lenses with an integrated autofocus motor. With any other lenses the camera's electronic rangefinder (which indicates if the subject inside the selected focus point is in focus or not) can be used to manually adjust focus.

The D5200 can mount unmodified A-lenses (also called Non-AI, Pre-AI or F-type) with support of the electronic rangefinder and without metering.

Firmware update

Nikon released a firmware update Ver. 1.01 for the D5200 on 14 November 2013. The update added support for EN-EL14a Rechargeable Li-ion Battery in the D5200. Another firmware update Ver. 1.02 was released on 21 January 2014 adding support for retractable lenses and providing bug fixes. Firmware Ver. 1.03 was released on 15 Sep 2015 fixing issues related to video framerate, and sensor cleaning bugs.

See also 
List of Nikon F-mount lenses with integrated autofocus motors

References

External links 

 Nikon D5200 Manual Nikon
 Nikon D5200 Product Page at Nikon Global
 Nikon D5200 Press Release
Nikon D5200 review Cameralabs
Nikon D5200 (review) Kenrockwell
Nikon D5200 video performance analyzed in detail

D5200
D5200
Live-preview digital cameras
Cameras introduced in 2012